Daviesia buxifolia, commonly known as box-leaf bitter-pea, is a species of flowering plant in the family Fabaceae and is endemic to south-eastern continental Australia. It is an open shrub with egg-shaped to round phyllodes and yellow or yellowish-orange and maroon-brown flowers.

Description
Juvenile phyllodes are slightly larger than the adult leaves.

Taxonomy
Daviesia buxifolia was first formally described in 1864 by George Bentham in Flora Australiensis. The specific epithet (buxifolia) means "box-tree-leaved".

Distribution and habitat
Box-leaf bitter-pea grows in poor or clay soils in forest, usually in mountainous terrain, south from the Tuross River in far south-eastern New South Wales to eastern Victoria.

References 

buxifolia
Flora of New South Wales
Flora of Victoria (Australia)
Plants described in 1864
Taxa named by George Bentham